The Radiolarian Ooze is the second album from Manorexia, it was released in 2002 by Ectopic Ents. Like its predecessor, Volvox Turbo, The Radiolarian Ooze is self-distributed by J. G. Thirlwell and sold exclusively at the Official Foetus Website.

Track listing

Personnel 
Quentin Jennings – mastering
J. G. Thirlwell – instruments, arrangements, production, recording, illustrations, design

References

External links
 The Radiolarian Ooze at foetus.org

2002 albums
Albums produced by JG Thirlwell
Manorexia albums